Little Tragedies is a 1979 Soviet television miniseries directed by Mikhail Schweitzer, based on works by Alexander Pushkin. Vladimir Vysotsky's last movie role.

Pushkin's works used
 Scene from Faust
 
 Mozart and Salieri (play)
 
 The Stone Guest (play)
 A Feast in Time of Plague (play)
 Egyptian Nights
 Гости съезжались на дачу…
 На углу маленькой площади…
 Мы проводили вечер на даче…
 Жил на свете рыцарь бедный…

Cast
 Matluba Alimova as Laura
 Natalya Belokhvostikova as Donna Anna
Nikolai Burlyayev as Alber, young Baron
 Natalya Danilova as Princess Volskaya
 Lidiya Fedoseyeva-Shukshina as Ekaterina Pavlovna
 Inna Gulaya as Queen of the Night
 Ivars Kalniņš as Faust and Don Carlos (voiced by Sergei Malishevsky)
 Leonid Kayurov as Alexey Ivanovich		
 Nikolai Kochegarov as Mephistopheles (voiced by Igor Yasulovich) and one of Laura's guests
 Mikhail Kokshenov as Ivan, servant
 Leonid Kuravlyov as Leporello, servant of Don Juan
 Ivan Lapikov as Priest
 Avangard Leontiev as Solomon
Grigory Malikov (episode)
 Radner Muratov (episode)
 Svetlana Pereladova as Mary
 Filipp Smoktunovsky as Duke (voiced by Igor Yasulovich)
Innokenty Smoktunovsky as Salieri and Old Baron
Georgy Taratorkin as Charsky
 Aleksandr Trofimov as Chairman
 Larisa Udovichenko as Alber's fiance and Louise
 Vladimir Vysotsky as Don Juan
 Sergei Yursky as Improvisator
 Valeri Zolotukhin as Mozart

References

External links

1979 films
Soviet television films
Soviet television miniseries
Films based on works by Aleksandr Pushkin
Films directed by Mikhail Shveytser
Films scored by Alfred Schnittke
Mosfilm films
Studio Ekran films
1970s Soviet television series
Vladimir Vysotsky
1979 in the Soviet Union
1970s television miniseries
Cultural depictions of Wolfgang Amadeus Mozart
Cultural depictions of Antonio Salieri